Michael Thomas McCarron (March 2, 1922 – October 2, 1991) was an American professional basketball player. Among other leagues and franchises, McCarron played for the Toronto Huskies, Baltimore Bullets, and  St. Louis Bombers in the Basketball Association of America (BAA) and National Basketball Association (NBA) in the late 1940s.

BAA/NBA career statistics

Regular season

References

1922 births
1991 deaths
American Basketball League (1925–1955) players
American expatriate basketball people in Canada
American men's basketball players
Baltimore Bullets (1944–1954) players
Basketball players from New York City
Guards (basketball)
Professional Basketball League of America players
Seton Hall Pirates men's basketball players
Sportspeople from Queens, New York
St. Louis Bombers (NBA) players
Toronto Huskies players
Undrafted National Basketball Association players